Castell was a county of northern Bavaria, Germany, ruling a string of territories in the historical region of Franconia, both east and west of Würzburg. Little is known about the noble Counts of Castell, although they were the counts of Kreis Gerolzhofen, Regierungsbezirk, and Unterfranken of Bavaria. They were a member of the Fränkische Grafenkolleg ("Franconian Counts College").

The two main branches of the House of Castell were Protestant Castell-Remlingen (later split into Castell-Castell) and Protestant and Catholic Castell-Rüdenhausen.

Castell was composed of three territories (Flecken) and 28 villages, with about 10,000 inhabitants at the time of mediatisation. The County of Castell joined Bavaria in 1806.

Partitions of Castell
Castell-Remlingen (1597–1806)
Castell-Castell (1668–1806)
Castell-Rüdenhausen (1597–1806)

Castell, County of
Franconian Circle
1709 establishments in the Holy Roman Empire

de:Castell (Unterfranken)
pl:Castell (wieś)
ru:Кастелль (Нижняя Франкония)